The Africa Zone served as a qualifying round to the 1987 Davis Cup Europe Zone.

Teams from 11 African nations competed for 2 places in the Europe Zone main draws. Zimbabwe and Senegal were the winners of the Africa Zone and qualified for the Europe Zone main draws.

Participating nations

Draw

First round

Ivory Coast vs. Tunisia

Senegal vs. Morocco

Second round

Ivory Coast vs. Nigeria

Kenya vs. Zimbabwe

Senegal vs. Algeria

Third round

Zimbabwe vs. Nigeria

Senegal vs. Egypt

References

External links
Davis Cup official website

Davis Cup Europe/Africa Zone
Africa Zone